Thomas Claiborne may refer to:
Thomas Claiborne (1749–1812), Democrat; Member of Virginia state legislature; U.S. Representative from Virginia
Thomas Claiborne (1780–1856), Democrat; Lawyer; member of Tennessee state house of representatives; U.S. Representative from Tennessee